The Georgian Co-Investment Fund (GCF) is a private equity fund. Established in 2013, the Fund investments in opportunities across sectors and industries which significantly contribute to the development of the Georgian economy, including Energy and Infrastructure, Hospitality and Real Estate, Agriculture and Logistics, and Manufacturing.

Updates
In 2019, Mr. Bachiashvili became the Head of Advisory Committee, and Mr. Ebralidze became the CEO of Georgian Co-Investment Fund. MR. Ebralidze served over five years as a Managing Director of Hospitality and Real Estate Sector of Georgian Co-Investment Fund.

In January 2014, Georgian Prime Minister, Irakli Garibashvili travelled to the World Economic Forum in Davos where the Georgian Co-Investment Fund was a discussed at length with representatives from major international Governments and Corporates.

In January 2014, GCF Chief Executive, George Bachiashvili, was listed in the Forbes “2014 30 Under 30: Finance” list.

In October 2013, a delegation from the Georgia, including Chief Executive George Bachiashvili, and led by Georgian Foreign Minister, Maia Panjikidze, visited Qatar to take part in high-level political and business discussions. Following this visit, it was announced that a Qatari delegation will visit Tbilisi to continue discussions surrounding potential investment in Georgia.

References

Financial services companies of Georgia (country)
Private equity portfolio companies
Companies based in Tbilisi
Financial services companies established in 2013
2013 establishments in Georgia (country)